The Great Eastern Crisis of 1875–78 began in the Ottoman Empire's territories on the Balkan peninsula in 1875, with the outbreak of several uprisings and wars that resulted in the intervention of international powers, and was ended with the Treaty of Berlin in July 1878.

It is also called ; Turkish: Şark Buhranı ("Eastern Crisis", for the crisis in general), Ramazan Kararnamesi ("Decree of Ramadan", for the sovereign default declared on 30 October 1875) and 93 Harbi ("War of 93", for the wars on the Balkan peninsula between 1877 and 1878, referring in particular to the Russo-Turkish War, the year 1293 on the Islamic Rumi calendar corresponding to the year 1877 on the Gregorian calendar).

Background

The state of Ottoman administration in the Balkans continued to deteriorate throughout the 19th century, with the Sublime Porte occasionally losing control over whole provinces. Reforms imposed by European powers did little to improve the conditions of the Christian population, while at the same time managing to dissatisfy a sizable portion of the Muslim population. Bosnia suffered at least two waves of rebellion by the local Muslim population, the most recent in 1850. Austria consolidated after the turmoil of the first half of the century and sought to reinvigorate its longstanding policy of expansion at the expense of the Ottoman Empire. Meanwhile, the nominally autonomous, de facto independent principalities of Serbia and Montenegro also sought to expand into regions inhabited by their compatriots. Nationalist and irredentist sentiments were strong and were encouraged by Russia and its agents.

Ottoman economic crisis and default
On 24 August 1854, during the Crimean War, the Ottoman Empire took its first foreign loans. The empire entered into subsequent loans, partly to finance the construction of railways and telegraph lines, and partly to finance deficits between revenues and the lavish expenditures of the imperial court, such as the construction of new palaces on the Bosphorus strait in Constantinople. Some financial commentators have noted that the terms of these loans were exceptionally favourable to the British and French banks (owned by the Rothschild family) which facilitated them, whereas others have noted that the terms reflected the imperial administration's willingness to constantly refinance its debts. A large amount of money was also spent for building new ships for the Ottoman Navy during the reign of Sultan Abdülaziz (r. 1861–1876). In 1875, the Ottoman Navy had 21 battleships and 173 warships of other types, which formed the third largest naval fleet in the world after those of the British and French navies. All of these expenditures, however, put a huge strain on the Ottoman treasury. In the meantime, a severe drought in Anatolia in 1873 and flooding in 1874 caused famine and widespread discontent in the heart of the empire. The agricultural shortages precluded the collection of necessary taxes, which forced the Ottoman government to declare a sovereign default on its foreign loan repayments on 30 October 1875 and increase taxes in all of its provinces, including the Balkans.

Uprisings and wars in the Balkans
The decision to increase taxes for paying the Ottoman Empire's debts to foreign creditors resulted in outrage in the Balkan provinces, which culminated in the Great Eastern Crisis and ultimately the Russo-Turkish War (1877–78) that provided independence or autonomy for the Christian nations in the empire's Balkan territories, with the subsequent Treaty of Berlin in 1878. The war, however, was disastrous for the already struggling Ottoman economy and the Ottoman Public Debt Administration was established in 1881, which gave the control of the Ottoman state revenues to foreign creditors. This made the European creditors bondholders, and assigned special rights to the OPDA for collecting various types of tax and customs revenues.

Aftermath
After the Treaty of Berlin in 1878, Austria-Hungary stationed military garrisons in the Ottoman Vilayet of Bosnia and Ottoman Sanjak of Novi Pazar, which formally (de jure) continued to be Ottoman territories. Taking advantage of the chaos that occurred during the Young Turk Revolution in 1908, Bulgaria declared its formal independence on 5 October 1908. The following day, Austria-Hungary unilaterally annexed Bosnia on 6 October 1908, but pulled its military forces out of Novi Pazar in order to reach a compromise with the Ottoman government and avoid a war (the Ottoman Empire lost the Sanjak of Novi Pazar with the Balkan Wars of 1912–1913.)

In 1881, France occupied the Ottoman Beylik of Tunisia, with the excuse that Tunisian troops had crossed the border into their colony of Algeria, which also formerly belonged to the Ottoman Empire until 1830. A year later, in 1882, the British Empire occupied the Ottoman Khedivate of Egypt, with the pretext of giving military assistance to the Ottomans for putting down the Urabi Revolt (Britain later declared Egypt a British protectorate on 5 November 1914, in response to the Ottoman government's decision to join World War I on the side of the Central Powers.) It is worth noting that the Ottoman government had frequently declared the tax revenues from Egypt as a surety for borrowing loans from British and French banks. The Ottoman government had earlier leased Cyprus to Britain in 1878, in exchange for British support at the Congress of Berlin in the same year (Cyprus was later annexed by Britain on 5 November 1914, for the same aforementioned reason regarding the Ottoman participation in World War I.) By obtaining Cyprus and Egypt, Britain gained an important foothold in the East Mediterranean and control over the Suez Canal; while France increased its lands in the West Mediterranean coast of North Africa by adding Tunisia to its empire as a French protectorate.

Historian Maroš Melichárek writes that the Great Eastern Crisis could not have been fully resolved without Serbia.

Chronology of the Great Eastern Crisis and its aftermath

Herzegovina uprising (1875–1877)
April Uprising (1876)
Razlovtsi insurrection (1876)
On June 30, 1876, Montenegro and Serbia declared war on the Ottoman Empire.
Serbian–Ottoman Wars (1876–1878)
Montenegrin–Ottoman War (1876–1878)
First Constitutional Era (1876–1878)
Constantinople Conference (1876–1877)
Russo-Turkish War (1877–1878)
Romanian War of Independence
Provisional Russian Administration in Bulgaria
Treaty of San Stefano (1878)
Expulsion of the Albanians, 1877–1878
Congress of Berlin (1878)
Kumanovo uprising (1878)
1878 Greek Macedonian rebellion
Epirus Revolt of 1878
Cretan revolt (1878)
Austro-Hungarian campaign in Bosnia and Herzegovina in 1878
Kresna–Razlog uprising (1878)

Treaties
Reichstadt Agreement (1876)
Budapest Convention of 1877
Treaty of San Stefano (1878)
Cyprus Convention (1878)
Treaty of Berlin (1878)

Aftermath
Armenian Question
League of Prizren (1878–1881)
Battles for Plav and Gusinje (1879–1880)
Pact of Halepa (1878)
Dual Alliance (1879)
ʻUrabi revolt (1879–1882)
Brsjak revolt (1880–1881)
French conquest of Tunisia (1881)
Austro–Serbian Alliance of 1881
Convention of Constantinople (1881)
Herzegovina Uprising (1882)
British Occupation of Egypt (1882)
Austro-Hungarian–German–Romanian alliance (1883)
Timok Rebellion (1883)
Bulgarian Crisis (1885–1888)

References

Further reading 
 
 
 Anderson, M.S. The Eastern Question, 1774–1923: A Study in International Relations (1966) online

 

 Langer, William L. European Alliances and Alignments: 1871-1890 (1950) pp 151–70. Online
 
 , Focus on the aftermath.
 Munro, Henry F. The Berlin congress (1918) online free, 41pp of text, 600 pp of documents
 
 

 
1870s in the Ottoman Empire
Rebellions against the Ottoman Empire
Ottoman period in the history of Bosnia and Herzegovina
Politics of the Ottoman Empire
Diplomacy
History of the Balkans
History of international relations
Ottoman Empire–Russian Empire relations
Austria–Turkey relations
National questions
1870s conflicts
Revolutionary waves